Olga Montaño is a Mexican former professional tennis player.

Montaño, who was given the name of her mother, is the eldest of three tennis playing siblings. Her brother Emilio was a Davis Cup player for Mexico and her sister Patricia was a national Federation Cup representative.

Partnering her sister, Montaño won the women's doubles gold medal at the 1966 Central American and Caribbean Games and was also a bronze medalist in the singles event.

In 1967 she featured in the main draw of the French Championships and fell in the first round to Maryna Godwin.

References

External links
 

Year of birth missing (living people)
Living people
Mexican female tennis players
Central American and Caribbean Games medalists in tennis
Central American and Caribbean Games gold medalists for Mexico
Central American and Caribbean Games bronze medalists for Mexico
Competitors at the 1966 Central American and Caribbean Games
20th-century Mexican women